Iain Robertson (born 27 May 1981) is a BAFTA award winning Scottish actor. He portrayed Lex in cult Glasgow gang film, Small Faces, though Robertson is also known for his work in the long-running children's drama, Grange Hill and The Debt Collector, also starring Billy Connolly.

Robertson featured in Steven Spielberg's Band of Brothers and played "Gash" in the cult Scottish comedy Rab C. Nesbitt.

Early life
Robertson grew up in a family of seven in a tenement in Govan, Glasgow. He held no thoughts of becoming an actor until a primary school teacher pointed out his talent for drama. Robertson has said: "growing up in Govan put fire in my belly, made me push harder and also appreciate the things that have come my way".

At the age of 11, Robertson joined a local dramatic arts group. He set about producing his own play, co-written and directed by his friends. Soon after, he won a scholarship to the Sylvia Young Theatre School in London.

Upon winning the scholarship at the age of 12, Robertson appeared in British dramas Kavanagh Q.C., Silent Witness , and Bramwell. In 1995 Gillies Mackinnon cast Robertson as the lead in the award winning feature film Small Faces.

Career
Robertson was once described by British film critic, Barry Norman, as "the best thing to come out of Scotland since whisky".

Robertson portrayed Craig Stevenson in the paranormal drama series Sea of Souls. He appeared in the big screen sequel Basic Instinct 2: Risk Addiction, alongside American actress Sharon Stone. In a prolific period, he took parts in the thriller The Contractor with  Wesley Snipes. He joined the cast of Rab C. Nesbitt returning to the streets of his youth.

In 2012, Robertson starred with Simon Callow and Harry Enfield in the feature-length film Acts of Godfrey, a British comedy written entirely in verse.

Robertson appeared as Spanky in a revival of John Byrne's Slab Boys trilogy, and as Romeo in Romeo and Juliet at the Citizens' Theatre. In 2009 he performed at the Lyceum Theatre in Edinburgh, in a theatre adaptation of James Hogg's "Confessions of a Justified Sinner".

During the 2010 Edinburgh Fringe Festival, Robertson performed in D.C. Jackson's My Romantic History at the Traverse Theatre.

Robertson also starred in a one-man show Angels by Ronan O'Donnell at the "Play, a Pie and a Pint" event in Glasgow. One critic described Robertson as giving 'the performance of a lifetime'.

In 2011 he appeared in a revival of The Hard Man, a play about the infamous Scottish criminal Jimmy Boyle.

Robertson starred with Dawn Steele on Sea of Souls, they had previously appeared together in The Slab Boys. He worked with co-star Bill Paterson on the feature film The Match.

Since 2017, he has played the role of Stevie O'Hara in River City, replacing Cas Harkins, who had played the role from 2003 to 2005.

Personal life
Robertson divorced his wife, Judith Milne in 2009, after three years of marriage.

In 2006, Robertson was accused of assaulting a photographer in Stirling, but was acquitted of the charge.

Filmography
Holby City (2017) (TV series)
River City (2017–) (TV series)
Holby City (2015) (TV series)
Whisky Galore (2015)
Pale Star (2015)
Holby City (2014) (TV series)
Acts of Godfrey (2010)
Rab C. Nesbitt (2008) (TV series)
Deep Soul (Greek movie), 2009
Next Time Ned (2009)
The Contractor (2007)
Basic Instinct 2 (2006)
Casualty (2005) (TV series)
Sea of Souls (2004) (TV series)
One Last Chance (2004)
Gunpowder, Treason & Plot (2003) (TV series)
Taggart (2002) (TV series)
Band of Brothers (2001) (miniseries)
Watchmen (2009)
Hereafter (2000) (TV series)
Fat Chance (2000)
Homesick (2000)
Oliver Twist (1999) (miniseries)
Rebus (1999) (TV series)
The Match (1999)
Poached (1998)
Grange Hill (1998)
Plunkett & Macleane (1998)
The Debt Collector (1998)
Bramwell (1998) (TV series)
Psychos (1998) (TV series)
Trail By Jury (1997) (TV series)
The Bill (1997) (TV series)
Silent Witness (1997) (TV series)
A Mugs Game (1996) (TV series)
Bodyguards (1996) (TV series)
Small Faces (1996)
Kavanagh QC (1995) (TV series)

Selected theatre credits
The Mysteries (1999) (Royal National Theatre)
The Good Hope (2000) (Royal National Theatre)
Romeo & Juliet (2006) (Citizens Theatre)
Blood Wedding (2006) (Citizens Theatre)
The Slab Boys Trilogy (2003) (Traverse Theatre)
The Winters Tale (2000) (Royal National Theatre)
The Tempest (2002) (Old Vic/Sheffield Crucible)
Passing Places (2001) (Greenwich Theatre)
Small Craft Warnings (2008) (Arcola Theatre)
Confessions of a Justified Sinner (2009) (Royal Lyceum Theatre)

Selected radio credits
McLevy: The Blue Gown (2011)
An Audience with Ed Reardon (2010)
The Sensitive (2010)
My Blue Hen (2009)
The Astronaut (2009)
Tough Love (2008)
Jimmy Murphy Makes Amends (2008)
Rebus - Black & Blue (2008)
Saturday, Sunday, Monday (2007)
The Tenderness of Wolves (2007)
Faust (2006)
The Best Snow for Skiing (2005)
Japanese Tales (2004)
Soft Fall the Sounds of Eden (2004)
Just Prose (2003)
The Nativity (2003)
The Passion (2003)
The Prisoner of Papa Stour (1996)

Awards
BAFTA (1996, for Small Faces)
Ian Charleson Commendation (1999, for The Mysteries)
Ian Charleson Award 3rd Prize (2002, for The Tempest)
BAFTA (2005, for Sea of Souls)
Edinburgh Fringe First (2010, for My Romantic History)

References

External links

1981 births
BAFTA winners (people)
Scottish male child actors
Living people
Male actors from Glasgow
Scottish male film actors
Scottish male stage actors
Scottish male television actors
Scottish male soap opera actors
Alumni of the Sylvia Young Theatre School